Justice S. Rathinavel Pandian (13 March 1929 - 28 February 2018) was a Judge of the Supreme Court of India. He was a versatile personality who worked in politics before entering the legal profession.

In the Supreme Court of India, he was one among the nine judges in the Constitution Bench which heard the famous Mandal Commission Case "Indira Sawhney vs Union of India". In that judgment delivered in 1992, the reservation for the backward classes was affirmed.

Since his retirement in 1994, he has been the Chairman of the 5th Pay Commission of India and submitted his final report in April 1997.

On August 14, 2006, he took charge as the Chairman of the National Commission for Backward Classes. He was given the status of a Cabinet Minister during his tenure, until 2009.

Early life and education 
Born in Tirupudaimarudur, Tirunelveli district, Tamil Nadu, Rathinavel Pandian completed his schooling at Theerthapathi School, Ambasamudram and his college education at St. Xavier College, Tirunelveli. In 1954, he studied law at the Chennai Law College.

Justice S. Ratnavel Pandian is survived by five sons and a daughter. His son Ratnavel pandian Subbaiah, is a sitting judge of the Madras High Court.

In politics 
Mr. Ratnavel Pandian was the District Secretary of the Dravida Munnetra Kazhagam in Tirunelveli district in the 1960s. When Karunanidhi was arrested during the anti-Hindi struggle and was in Palayankottai jail, Rathinavel Pandian used to visit him every day. Vaiko, the general secretary of the Marumalarchi Dravida Munnetra Kazhagam party, was one of his junior lawyers. He also contested Ambasamudram and Cheranmakhadevi constituencies on behalf of DMK. Then, he gave serious interest in his work as an Advocate.

As an Advocate 
In the early days Mr. Ratnavel Pandian, took his apprenticeship with Mr. K. Narayanasamy, Senior Advocate.  After Mr. K. Narayanasamy Mudaliar became a Judge of the Madras High Court, Mr. Pandian worked as a Junior Advocate with Mr. Cellapandian and with Mr. Rajagopala Iyer. After seventeen years as a lawyer, he was appointed the Attorney General of the Chennai High Court in the Year 1971.

As a High Court Judge 
Mr. Ratnavel Pandian was elevated as a Judge of the Madras High Court in 1974.

Statue of Manu Neethi Chola 
The statue of Manu Neethi or Samaneethi Cholan was erected by Justice Ratnavel Pandian at the Madras High Court premises. (The statue of Samaneethi Cholan, who executed his son and sentenced him to death for causing the death of a calf for which the cow had sought justice.)

As a Supreme Court Judge 
On December 14, 1988, he was appointed a Judge of the Supreme Court of India. On March 12, 1994, he retired from his service as the Judge of the Supreme Court of India.

Life Time Achievement Award 
Madras Bar Association had given "Life Time Achievement Award" to Justice S. Ratnavel Pandian. It was presented by Mr. Justice Sathish K. Agnihotri Acting Chief Justice, Madras High Court on June 21, 2014.

References

1929 births
2018 deaths
Chief Justices of the Madras High Court
Justices of the Supreme Court of India
People from Tirunelveli district